The Starlit Garden is a 1923 British silent romantic film directed by Guy Newall and starring Newall, Ivy Duke, Lawford Davidson and Mary Rorke. The film is set in Italy and concerns a doomed romance between a ward and her guardian. It was made at Beaconsfield Studios.

Cast
 Guy Newall as Richard Pinckney 
 Ivy Duke as Phyllis Berknowles 
 Valia Venitshaya as Frances Blett 
 A. Bromley Davenport as Colonel Grangerson 
 Lawford Davidson as Silas Grangerson 
 Mary Rorke as Aunt Maria 
 Cecil Morton York as Hennessey 
 John Alexander as Rafferty 
 Marie Ault as Old Prue

References

Bibliography
 Low, Rachael. History of the British Film, 1918-1929. George Allen & Unwin, 1971.
 Warren, Patricia. British Film Studios: An Illustrated History. Batsford, 2001.

External links
 

1923 films
1923 romantic drama films
British silent feature films
Films based on works by Henry De Vere Stacpoole
Films directed by Guy Newall
Films set in Italy
Films based on Irish novels
Films shot at Beaconsfield Studios
British romantic drama films
British black-and-white films
1920s British films
Silent romantic drama films